Hristo Nikolov may refer to:

 Hristo Nikolov-Choko (born 1939), Bulgarian footballer
 Hristo Nikolov (footballer) (born 1980), Bulgarian footballer
 Hristo Nikolov (basketball) (born 1985), Bulgarian basketball player
 Hristo Nikolov (volleyball) (born 1990), Macedonian volleyball player